John F. Toepp (September 25, 1920 - April 24, 1979) was an American politician.  He was a Republican member of both houses of the Michigan Legislature between 1963 and 1978.

Born in Ohio, Toepp attended Western Michigan University. He served one term in the Michigan House of Representatives and was elected to the Senate in 1966, succeeding Guy Vander Jagt who had won election to Congress. Toepp served in the Senate until his defeat in 1978. He was an alternate delegate to the 1972 Republican National Convention.

Toepp a broadcaster for high school football and basketball games with the radio station WATT, and for the National Basketball League.

References

Republican Party members of the Michigan House of Representatives
Republican Party Michigan state senators
Western Michigan University alumni
1920 births
1979 deaths
20th-century American politicians